Melbourne Airport may refer to:

Australia

Melbourne Airport or Melbourne Tullamarine Airport, also listed by some airlines as Melbourne Tullamarine, the major international airport in Melbourne, Victoria, Australia (IATA: MEL)
Melbourne Airport, Victoria, the suburb in which the Australian airport is located
Melbourne Avalon Airport, a secondary domestic airport near Melbourne, Victoria, Australia (IATA: AVV)

Canada
Melbourne Aerodrome, a private airport in Melbourne, Ontario, Canada

United States
Melbourne Orlando International Airport, in Melbourne, Florida, United States (FAA: MLB)
Melbourne Municipal Airport, a former name of the Melbourne Orlando International Airport
Melbourne Municipal Airport, in Melbourne, Arkansas, United States (FAA: 42A)